Events from the year 1875 in Sweden

Incumbents
 Monarch – Oscar II

Events

 - Inauguration of the Swedish Theatre (Stockholm). 
 - Alfred Nobel invents the Gelignite.
 - First issue of the Falkenbergs Tidning
 - Göteborgs BK is founded.
 - Elsa Borg move to Stockholm and open the first bible home for education of Christian social workers in the slums.
 - The Rower woman profession is formally abolished (though not forbidden) in Stockholm.

Births

 14 January - Felix Hamrin, prime minister   (died 1937)
 21 June - Nelly Thüring, politician   (died 1972)

Deaths

 28 February - Sophia Isberg, wood cut artist (born 1819) 
 5 July - Maria Röhl, portrait artist  (born 1801) 
 18 November - Martina von Schwerin, Lady of letters, salonist and culture personality  (born 1789)

References

 
Years of the 19th century in Sweden
Sweden